SelTrac is a digital railway signalling technology used to automatically control the movements of rail vehicles. It was the first fully automatic moving-block signalling system to be commercially implemented.

What is now branded as SelTrac was originally developed in the 1970s by Standard Elektrik Lorenz (the "SEL" in the name) of Germany for the Krauss-Maffei Transurban, an automated guideway transit system proposed for the GO-Urban network in the Greater Toronto Area in Canada. Although the GO-Urban project failed, the Transurban efforts were taken over by an Ontario consortium led by the Urban Transportation Development Corporation (UTDC), and adapted to become its Intermediate Capacity Transit System (ICTS). This technology was first used on the SkyTrain network in Vancouver, British Columbia and the Scarborough RT in Toronto, Ontario.

SelTrac was primarily sold and developed by Alcatel, through a subsidiary. SelTrac is now sold by Thales from their Canadian unit, after it purchased many of Alcatel's non-telephony assets. New versions were made for different markets, and today SelTrac is used for rolling stock control around the world and is branded as a communications-based train control (CBTC) system.

Description

Communication
The original SelTrac system was based on inductive loops that provided a communications channel as well as positioning information. Normally an inductive loop is used solely as a communications system, with electromagnets on the vehicles or stations inducing currents in the loop that can be read at a distant location. In the case of SelTrac, the central computer sent data to the vehicles at 1200 bit/s on a 36 kHz carrier while the vehicles had 600 bit/s on a 56 kHz carrier. Separate pair of antennas is used for transmission and another pair is used for reception.

The two-wire inductive loop system was prone to vandalism and, in newer versions of SelTrac, the control signal is transmitted inside the running rails at radio frequency using IEEE 802.11 (WiFi) access points.

Position keeping
SelTrac uses the twisted-loop concept developed by Siemens in the 1950s. SelTrac's loops cross every 25 meters to form lozenge-shaped areas. The communications system on the vehicles can detect a phase change in the signal caused by these crossover points, allowing them to place themselves within a single one of these sub-loops. Position within the loop can be further measured by counting axle revolutions. The vehicles broadcast this position information into the loops, along with IDs, speed, direction and other data.

This system is not accurate enough for positioning within a station. Further accuracy is provided by "station alignment boards" which the train attempts to capture directly beside a sensor. When approaching a station, the vehicle is slowed to allow the board to be captured by the onboard sensors, and the vehicle automatically brakes to a stop at a constant speed when it is seen. If the train passes the board, due to ice on the rails for instance, the train has to be manually reversed to capture it again. The stopping position of the train is especially important when the platform doors are used. Both sets of doors, train doors and platform doors must be precisely aligned, with just a few cm tolerance, to avoid the obstruction for passengers (specifically on wheelchairs). Platform doors are widely used on stations with expected large crowds of passengers such as in Shanghai Metro, Mekkah, Dubai and others.

Traffic control
In traditional train control, the railway is split into control "blocks" with signals in each one. Blocks are sized to allow the heaviest or fastest trains to stop fully within them. That way if a train is stopped in the next block, the following train will always have time to fully stop before reaching it. Careful tuning of block spacing is needed; if they are signals that are placed too close from each other, train speeds have to be reduced so they can still stop in time, but spacing them out further means the trains are also spread out and the route capacity drops.

SelTrac automatically maintains headway between vehicles through a moving block system. In this system the start and end points of the blocks are not fixed, and move along with the trains. This allows the central control system to calculate a point on the track where every train can safely move without further instruction—in a fixed block system this would be the next set of signals, but with SelTrac it is constantly being updated.

In theory this system could eliminate the "brick wall" criterion and allow the trains to run as close together as the communications speed would allow, but in practice a further spacing is typically imposed (for instance 50 m in the case of the Docklands Light Railway).

Speed control
When originally being designed, computers were expensive and data storage was limited. In keeping with this model, the original SelTrac used on the ICTS centralized all control. After receiving location information from a vehicle, the blocks and safe target points for each were calculated, and this information was then broadcast back out through the inductive loop to be received by the vehicles. Onboard controllers used this information to calculate a safe speed to approach the next target point, and modified its current speed appropriately. The system was designed to reduce the complexity, and thus cost, of the vehicle controllers as much as possible.

In modern systems, much more information can be stored in the vehicle controllers. These now know the layout of the track, speed limits and various other data. This allows the controllers to make much better decisions about setting their speed—speeding up before an incline for instance.

Product family 
SelTrac is offered in two ways:
 
1. A complete integrated solution in which movement authority and interlocking are integrated within wayside zone controllers; this reduces equipment and potential interfacing issues. Integrating the management of the interlocking with train location information, as communicated through the CBTC system, allows faster response times, more tightly controlled movements, and easier expandability and adaptability. Interfaces within the zone controller are more easily designed than those between subsystems. The integrated system knows the position of each train to a high degree of accuracy. It can control the behavior of the train at all times and, in response to changing conditions, can modify the behavior to ensure safety of the system while offering maximum service. It can adapt its algorithms to take advantage of individual train behavior, and change parameters to ensure optimum use of resources, such as platform availability and traction power. The limit of movement authority setting logic has a high impact on the end system performance, i.e. managing the interlocking in an integrated manner. Interlocking and switch control logic is optimized using position reports of communicating trains. The integrated design includes:
 Unattended and driverless train operation and cab-signalling modes
 Moving-block technology
 Automatic performance modification
 Fully redundant train to wayside configurations
 Data communication option (loop or radio)
 Automatic route setting
 Quick-start reset
 Solid-state interlocking and remote point machine control
 Automatic coupling/uncoupling

2. A 'progressive' overlay solution:

(a) Speed and signal safeguard: it vitally supervises speed profiles and signal adherence and provides all the functions of an intermittent ATP (automatic train protection)

(b) Continuous automatic train protection: provides the added value of improved headway while maintaining safe train separation, without depending on axle counters or track circuits. The system will automatically generate movement authorities based on actual locations of moving and fixed obstacles. It is used in conjunction with external interlockings and provides a replacement for automatic separation signals between interlockings. It can operate seamlessly with existing track circuits, which provides an inherent mechanism to operate mixed-mode traffic.

(c) Automatic train operation (ATO) offering automatic train movement allowing a driver to operate "hands-off" and thereby improve running performance.

Moving to fully automatic operation (FAO) provides an excellent means to match train supply to passenger demand.

Data communication 

Data communication is provided with either low frequency inductive loop or a high bandwidth, open-standards wireless system incorporating spread-spectrum radio technology.

Data Communication System (DCS) 
 Open-standard single integrated network providing communication between all train control subsystems and consists of three major elements:
 free-space radio link (to/from all trains)
 wayside network
 security system.
 Ethernet IP network is based on the IEEE 802.3 standard.
 Radios, compliant with the IEEE 802.11 standard, are deployed at measured intervals along the trackside and are used to provide a wireless link to the trains.
 Each train has a mobile radio at each end used to provide an interface to the vehicle on-board computer and to complete the wireless link to the trackside.
 All equipment used to create the DCS system is commercial off-the-shelf (COTS).

SelTrac installations 
SelTrac is installed in many railways around the world, including the following:

 Ankara Metro Line M1 1997 SelTrac CBTC DTO 
 Beijing Subway Line 4 2009 SelTrac CBTC/R (radio) ATO with Attendant 
 Busan–Gimhae Light Rail Transit 2011 SelTrac CBTC/R UTO
 Canadian Pacific Railway - BC North Line 1990 ATCS Radio-Based Train Protection
 Detroit People Mover 1987 SelTrac CBTC UTO
 Dubai Metro – Red and Green Lines 2009/2011 SelTrac CBTC UTO
 Edmonton Light Rail Transit 2014 SelTrac CBTC/R ATP
 Guangzhou Metro 
Line 3 2009/10 SelTrac CBTC DTO
Line 9 2017 SelTrac CBTC DTO
Line 14 2017 SelTrac CBTC DTO
Line 21 2017 SelTrac CBTC DTO
 Hong Kong International Airport APM 2014/15 SelTrac CBTC/R UTO
 Hong Kong MTR
 Tuen Ma line 2003 SelTrac CBTC DTO
 West Rail line 2003
 Ma On Shan line 2004
 Kowloon Southern Link 2009
 Tuen Ma line (Phase 1) 2020
 Tuen Ma line (full line) 2021
 Disneyland Resort line  2005 SelTrac CBTC/R UTO
 Hyderabad Metro Rail (Lines 1, 2, 3) 2017 SelTrac CBTC/R STO
 Incheon Subway Line 2 2014 SelTrac CBTC/R  UTO
 Istanbul Metro M4 Kadikoy-Kartal Line  2012 SelTrac CBTC  STO 
 Jacksonville Skyway ASE 1998 SelTrac CBTC UTO
 John F. Kennedy International Airport AirTrain JFK APM 2003 SelTrac CBTC UTO
 Kuala Lumpur Rapid Rail
 Kelana Jaya Line 1998/2014 SelTrac CBTC UTO
 Ampang Line 2015 SelTrac CBTC/R DTO/UTO
 Las Vegas Monorail 2004 SelTrac CBTC/R UTO
 London Docklands Light Railway 1995 SelTrac CBTC DTO
 Lewisham Extension 1999
 London City Airport Extension 2005
 Woolwich Arsenal Extension 2009
 Stratford Extension 2011
 London Underground
 Jubilee line 2011 SelTrac TBTC STO
 Northern line 2014 SelTrac TBTC STO
 Metropolitan, District, Circle, Hammersmith & City 2020 SelTrac CBTC/R STO
 Piccadilly line originally planned 2014 - project currently postponed
 Manaus Monorail 2015 SelTrac CBTC UTO
 Mecca Metro 2011 SelTrac CBTC UTO
 Newark Liberty International Airport AirTrain Newark 1996/2001 SelTrac CBTC UTO
 New York City Subway
 BMT Canarsie Line – Phase III 2006 Interoperability Program  SelTrac CBTC/R STO
 IRT Flushing Line 2016 SelTrac CBTC/R STO
 Ottawa O-Train Confederation Line 2018 SelTrac CBTC/R  STO
 Paris Metro Line 13 – Ouragan 2012 SelTrac CBTC/R DTO
 SFMTA Muni Metro (Market Street Subway) 1997 SelTrac CBTC DTO
 São Paulo Metro Line 17 postponed to 2021 SelTrac CBTC UTO
 Seoul Metropolitan Subway Shinbundang Line 2011 SelTrac CBTC/R UTO
 Shanghai Metro
 Line 6 2011 SelTrac CBTC/R STO
 Line 8 2011 SelTrac CBTC/R STO
 Line 9 2011 SelTrac CBTC/R STO
 Line 7 2010 SelTrac CBTC/R STO
 Line 11 2010 SelTrac CBTC/R STO
 Singapore MRT
 North South line 2017/2018 SelTrac CBTC/R UTO
 East West line 2017/2018 SelTrac CBTC/R UTO
 Tampa International Airport APM 1992 SelTrac CBTC UTO
 Toronto rapid transit 2008/10 SelTrac Speed/Signal Safeguard 
 Line 3 Scarborough 1985 SelTrac CBTC DTO
 Toronto streetcar electronic track switching system
 Vancouver TransLink SkyTrain
 Vancouver SkyTrain - Expo Line 1985  SelTrac CBTC UTO
 Vancouver SkyTrain - Millennium Line 2002 SelTrac CBTC UTO
 Vancouver SkyTrain - Canada Line 2009 SelTrac CBTC UTO
 Vancouver SkyTrain - Evergreen Line 2016 SelTrac CBTC UTO
 Walt Disney World Monorail 1989 SelTrac ATP Disney/TGI
 Washington Dulles Airport AeroTrain APM 2009 SelTrac CBTC/R UTO
 Wuhan Metro Line 1 2004/10 SelTrac CBTC DTO

SelTrac Incidents

 2021 Kelana Jaya LRT collision - no fatalities but 213 injured
 2019 MTR Tsuen Wan Line CBTC accident - no fatalities but two MTR staff sent to hospital for observations
 2017 Joo Koon rail accident - no fatalities but 38 injuries including 2 SMRT staff

See also 
 SelTrac technology
 Moving Block Why do we Need It

References 

Railway signalling
Rapid transit